"Such a Shame" is a Talk Talk song.

Such a Shame may also refer to:

 "Such a Shame" (Bee Gees song)
 "Such a Shame", a song by The Cranberries, released first in the single "Just My Imagination" and then the album Bury the Hatchet
 "Such a Shame", a song by The Kinks in Kinkdom

See also 
 "Fluorescent Grey/Oh, It's Such A Shame", a single by Jay Reatard and Deerhunter
 "It's Such a Shame", a song by The Static Jacks from the album If You're Young